Gloucester Business Park is a business park situated in Brockworth on the outskirts of Gloucester, England with close links to the M5 and A417.

Current residents of the business park include Direct Wines, Horizon Nuclear Power, Ageas, NHS and Detica.

In 2009 the business park won an award from the British Association of Landscape Industries.

References

External links 
 Gloucester Business Park website

Business parks of England
Buildings and structures in Gloucester